Tony Sampson (born August 17, 1977) is a Canadian musician, oiler and retired actor. From 1999 to 2009, he voiced Eddy in the Cartoon Network animated series Ed, Edd n Eddy.

Biography 
Tony Sampson was born on August 17, 1977 in Vancouver, Canada. He has played the role of Flash in the Canadian television drama The Odyssey and Eddy from Ed, Edd, n Eddy. Sampson has also worked for Vancouver's Ocean Productions and Voicebox Productions, primarily in anime.

After Ed, Edd n Eddy ended in 2009, he retired from acting to work in the oil sands industry in Fort McMurray to operate heavy equipment. Sampson later revealed this was because the production company he was working under threatened to blacklist him from the acting industry after requesting a modest raise.

Since 2013, he has been a musical artist with songs on Spotify and iTunes. Sampson once made a guest appearance at the March Toronto Anime Con in 2006.

Filmography

Animation 
 Captain Zed and the Zee Zone as Nasty Norman, Additional Voices
 Cardcaptors as Tori Avalon
 Cardcaptors: The Movie as Tori Avalon
 Dokkoida?! as Additional Voices
 Dragon Ball Z (Ocean Dub) as Pigero (ep. 10)
 Ed, Edd n Eddy as Eddy
 Ed, Edd n Eddy's Big Picture Show as Eddy
 Elemental Gelade as Rig (ep. 5), Additional Voices
 Exosquad as Pirate
 Fat Dog Mendoza as Additional Voices
 Fatal Fury: Legend of the Hungry Wolf as Young Andy Bogard
 Fatal Fury 2: The New Battle as Tony
 Galaxy Angel as Darling (ep. 10), Max (ep. 20)
 The Grim Adventures of the KND as Eddy
 Hikaru no Go as Aoki
 Human Crossing as Driver (ep. 5), Young Ichiro (ep. 6), Bully (ep. 11), Gang Member C (ep. 12)
 Infinite Ryvius as Marco, Ryu Gil
 Inuyasha as Seikai's Disciple (ep. 22)
 Master Keaton as Phil (ep. 34)
 Mega Man as Gemini Man
 MegaMan NT Warrior as Dex Oyama
 MegaMan NT Warrior Axess as Dex Oyama
 Mobile Suit Gundam SEED as Miguel Aiman, Recap Narrator (ep. 26)
 My Little Pony Tales as Teddy
 Please Save My Earth as Jinpachi Ogura/Gyokuran
 Project ARMS as Lt. Karl Higgins (eps. 21-23), Additional Voices
 Ranma ½ as Genji Heita (ep. 74)
 Starship Operators as Hide Chiba (eps. 3, 10 & 13)
 Tokyo Underground as Additional Voices
 Transformers: Armada as Fred
 What About Mimi? as Brock Wickersham
 X-Men: Evolution as Berzerker/Ray Crisp

Video games 
 Tonka Town as Chris the Crane, Tooey Timingbelt

Live-action 
 Annie O (1995 TV Film) as Heckler #1
 Are You Afraid of the Dark? as Shawn Mackenzie ("The Tale of the Water Demons")
 Da Vinci's Inquest as David Crayling ("The Most Dangerous Time")
 Dead Like Me as College Boy ("Sunday Mornings")
 Dirty Little Secret (1998 TV Film) as Clerk
 Man of the House as Big Kid at School #1
 Millennium as Anthony ("The Mikado")
 Poltergeist: The Legacy as George ("The Substitute")
 The Angel of Pennsylvania Avenue as Newsboy
 The Commish as Derek ("The Sharp Pinch")
 The Odyssey as Keith/Flash Haldane
 The X-Files as Brad ("Red Museum"), Harley (Brother #1) ("Kill Switch")

Discography 
 Blasm! (studio album, 2018)

References

External links 

Tony Sampson at CrystalAcids

Canadian male voice actors
Canadian male child actors
Canadian oilmen
Canadian electronic musicians
21st-century Canadian male musicians
Living people
1977 births